Menziesia was a genus of flowering plant in the family Ericaceae. More recently it has been reclassified within the genus Rhododendron. it was formally transferred in 2011.

Species
 Menziesia ciliicalyx (Miq.) Maxim. = Rhododendron benhallii
 Menziesia ferruginea Sm. = Rhododendron menziesii - False azalea or Fool's huckleberry
 Menziesia glabella A.Gray = Rhododendron menziesii subsp. glabellum
 Menziesia multiflora Maxim. = Rhododendron multiflorum
 Menziesia pilosa Michx. ex Lam. = Rhododendron pilosum  - Minnie bush; Allegheny menziesia
 Menziesia katsumatae M.Tash. & H.Hatta. = Rhododendron katsumatae
 Menziesia purpurea Maxim. Rhododendron kroniae
 Menziesia pentandra Maxim. = Rhododendron pentandrum
 Menziesia yakushimensis M.Tash. & H.Hatta = Rhododendron yakushimense
 Menziesia goyozanensis M.Kikuchi = Rhododendron goyozanense

References

Bibliography 
 
 

Historically recognized angiosperm genera
Ericoideae